The Romania women's national rugby union team first played in 2007. Their widely recognized nickname is "The Acorns", as an offshoot of the men's team which are called "The Oaks".

History

Results summary
(Full internationals only)

Results

Full internationals

External links
   Federaţia Română de Rugby - Official Site
 PlanetaOvala.ro - Romanian Rugby News
 www.rugby.ro 
 Planet-Rugby news for Romania
 SOS kit aid

Women's national rugby union teams
European national women's rugby union teams
Rugby union in Romania
R